Édouard Niankoye Lamah is a Guinean Politician, former Foreign Minister, then Minister for Public Health.

Career 
He was Foreign Minister before being replaced by François Lonseny Fall.

He was named Minister of Health on May 26, 2018, replacing Dr. Abdourahmane Diallo in the first Kassory government, before being replaced by Remy Lamah in November 2019.

References 
 

 

Living people
Foreign Ministers of Guinea
21st-century Guinean people
Year of birth missing (living people)
Government ministers of Guinea